Pappa Pia is a 2017 Hungarian comedy film directed by Gábor Csupó.

Cast 
  - Tomi
  - Mara
 Feró Nagy	- Papi
 András Stohl - Wizy

References

External links 

2017 comedy films
Films directed by Gábor Csupó
Hungarian comedy films
Hungarian-language films